Zuyevo is a rural locality (a village) in Kalinnikovsky Selsoviet, Birsky District, Bashkortostan, Russia. The population was 80 as of 2010. There are 3 streets.

Geography 
Zuyevo is located 35 km southeast of Birsk (the district's administrative centre) by road. Sorvikha is the nearest rural locality.

References 

Rural localities in Birsky District